Samuel Kekewich was Member of Parliament for Sudbury between 1698 to his death in 1700.

References

1657 births
1700 deaths